Levi Barber (October 16, 1777 – April 23, 1833) was a surveyor, court administrator, banker, and legislator who served two non-conservative terms in the United States House Of Representatives in the early 19th century.

Early life and career 
Levi Barber was born in Simsbury, Connecticut, the son of David Barber and Sarah Lawrence.  Levi moved to Ohio where he was a surveyor in the employ of the federal government.  His name appears on early survey records in what later became Monroe County, Ohio. He also surveyed many other places in Ohio, for example his name is listed as the surveyor in 1802 in Bethel Township in Miami county, Ohio, according to the original source document. 

On February 15, 1803, in Washington County, Ohio, Levi Barber married Elizabeth Rouse of Massachusetts.  They had at least four children: David, Elizabeth, Austin and Levi, Jr.  (Levi Barber, Jr., was a presidential elector from Ohio in 1868, casting his ballot for Ulysses S. Grant.)

He was appointed Washington County surveyor in November 1805 and served until July 1816.  He was commissioned receiver of the United States land office in Marietta, Ohio, on April 1, 1807.

Levi Barber was elected from Washington County to the Ohio House of Representatives in 1806.  He served as clerk of the Court of Common Pleas and the court of Washington County from 1809 until 1817, when he resigned to take his seat in Congress.  He also served as a Justice of the Peace and performed civil marriages.

During the War of 1812, Levi Barber was an aide to Governor Return J. Meigs, Jr.

Congress
Levi Barber was elected in 1816 as a Democratic-Republican from Ohio's 3rd congressional district to the Fifteenth United States Congress.  He was unsuccessful in his 1818 bid for reelection.  In 1819 Levi Barber was again elected from Washington and Athens counties to the Ohio legislature and held the certificate of election. But the seat was contested by Sardina Stone, who was seated.  In 1820, he again ran and was elected to the Seventeenth United States Congress.  But after that term, he was unsuccessful in his run for reelection in 1822.

Later career and death 
Levi Barber was appointed Trustee of Ohio University in Athens, Ohio in 1822 and served until his death.  He was also the fourth president of the Bank of Marietta, the first bank chartered in Ohio.

Levi Barber died in Harmar, Ohio (now a part of Marietta) and was interred in Harmar Cemetery.

References 

 Walker, Charles M.   History of Athens County, Ohio : and, incidentally, of the Ohio Land Company and the first settlement of the state at Marietta.  Cincinnati: R. Clarke, 1869, 614 pgs.
 Andrews, Israel Ward.  Washington County and the early settlement of Ohio.  Cincinnati: P. G. Thomson, 1877, 83 pgs.
 Taylor, William Alexander.  Ohio statesmen and annals of progress : from the year 1788 to the year 1900.  Columbus, Ohio: Press of the Westbote Co., state printers, 1899 (©1898), 458 pgs.
 Summers, Thos. J.   History of Marietta.  Marietta, Ohio: Leader Publishing Co., printers, 1903, 338 pgs.

1777 births
1833 deaths
American surveyors
Members of the Ohio House of Representatives
Politicians from Marietta, Ohio
Ohio University trustees
Democratic-Republican Party members of the United States House of Representatives from Ohio